Ollila is a Finnish surname. Notable people with the surname include:

 Yrjö Ollila (1887–1932), Finnish Impressionist painter, designer and muralist
 Les Ollila (born 1943), American evangelist
 Jorma Ollila (born 1950), Finnish businessman
 Antti Ollila (born 1994), Finnish freestyle skier

Finnish-language surnames